Bilal Khan (born Bilal Ahmed Khan, 4 October 1986) is a Pakistani musician, actor, and YouTuber. He released his debut album Umeed in 2009. Singles released included "Bachana", "Tou Kia Hua", "Larho Mujhey", "Kabhi Gham Na Aey", and Mata-e-Jaan Hai Tu. In 2012, he has been nominated for Best Album at the 11th Lux Style Awards for the album "Umeed". Khan holds a BSc (Hons) degree in Politics and Economics from Lahore University of Management Sciences (LUMS) and later studied from Virginia Commonwealth University.

Early life and career

Early life and career 

Bilal Khan was born on 4 October 1986. He had love for music from early days, buying guitars and playing music in his very room. He learned to play guitar through various articles on internet. He then moved to Lahore University of Management Sciences for a degree in Economics and Political Sciences.

While still studying at Lahore University of Management Sciences, Bilal Khan released a song called "Bachana" that was released on YouTube. The song was later played on different music video channels in Pakistan in particular MTV. This earned him Best Singer of 2010 and Best Song of 2010 voted by the Pakistan FM 103.

His first international concert was held in Kuala Lumpur and he has performed in the United Kingdom, US, Canada and United Arab Emirates. Khan, from an introvert individual, was starting to become a popular for every university and school to have him sing.

Coke Studio (2011–2018) 
Shortly after his musical career started he was called upon to sing for Coke Studio Season 4, marking his debut in Coke Studio. He performed two songs from his album "Umeed" on Coke Studio Pakistan, "To Kia Hua" and "Lamha". He returned again on Coke Studio Pakistan, in season five, to sing songs from his second album "Maktoob" including "Larho Mujhey" and "Taaray". In 2012, he left for the United States to pursue studies which led to a brief hiatus from singing. He returned to Pakistan in 2016 and restarted his musical career, while also venturing into acting. In addition, he makes vlogs on his YouTube channel. Khan has also performed his own song "Apna Gham" on Coke Studio (season 11) alongside Mishal Khawaja.

Playback singing 

Bilal Khan has sung the official soundtracks of three Hum TV drama's including "Mata-e-Jaan" for Mata-e-Jaan Hai Tu, "Roshan Sitara" along with QB for Roshan Sitara and "Khamoshi" for Khamoshi (TV series). He was also nominated for Best singer at the 12th Lux Style Awards for "Mata e Jaan". Khamoshi was also nominated for Best Original Soundtrack Popular

Sponsorships 

Bilal Khan recorded a song for Levi's called Anjaane, along with Zoe Vicajee, to pay tribute to "Strings". He also modeled for the Go Forth campaign by Levi's. In 2011 Khan released a tribute to Alamgir by recording the song called "Dekha Na Tha".

Acting career
Khan acted in a telefilm called Tamanna ki Tamanna (2012) as Jazib Khan, that aired on Hum TV. The script was written by Bushra Ansari. It also stars Mathira and Sanam Saeed. It was directed by Siraj-ul-Haq and produced by Momina Duraid.

Khan also acted in the Hum TV drama Sammi (2017) in which he played the role of Aliyaan, Sammi was also his debut drama. He has acted in Hum TV's hit drama serial Khamoshi (2017–2018) as Shahram in the main lead alongside Zara Noor Abbas, Affan Waheed and Iqra Aziz.

Television

Discography

UMEED

Singles

Coke Studio (Pakistan)

OST

References

External links
 
 

1986 births
Living people
Male actors from Lahore
Lahore University of Management Sciences alumni
Pakistani expatriates in the United States
Pakistani pop singers
Pakistani male singer-songwriters
Singers from Lahore
Urdu-language singers
Video bloggers
Male bloggers
Pakistani YouTubers
21st-century Pakistani male singers